St. John Baptist Church is a historic Baptist church located in Lecompte, Louisiana. It was added to the National Register of Historic Places on June 25, 1982.

References

Churches on the National Register of Historic Places in Louisiana
Churches completed in 1888
19th-century Baptist churches in the United States
Churches in Rapides Parish, Louisiana
Queen Anne architecture in Louisiana
National Register of Historic Places in Rapides Parish, Louisiana